Fedkovo is a rural locality (a village) in Pezhemskoye Rural Settlement of Velsky District, Arkhangelsk Oblast, Russia. The population was 7 as of 2014.

Geography 
Fedkovo is located 28 km southwest of Velsk (the district's administrative centre) by road. Pritykinskaya is the nearest rural locality.

References 

Rural localities in Velsky District